The Kurykans (pinyin: Gǔlìgān < Middle Chinese ZS: *kuət̚-liɪH-kɑn) were a Turkic Tiele tribe, that inhabited the Lake Baikal area near the Mongol border in the 6th century Early Kurykans migrated from  Yenisey river.

According to the article on "the Origin of Yakuts, Analysis of the Y-Chromosome Haplotypes", published by the researchers from the Tomsk National Research Medical Center of the Russian Academy of Sciences in the Russian "Molecular Biology" journal in 2008: 

Gumilyov and Okladnikov proposed that Kurykans were ancestors of Yakuts, though this is still uncertain. Peter B. Golden notes that the name Kurykan is etymologisable on the basis of Mongolic quriğan "lamb" (compare Khalkha: хурга hurga < Middle Mongolian quraɣ-a(n)) yet no additional evidence exists that Kurykans also spoke a Mongolic language. In translation from the Old Turkic, word quri'qan ~ qoriyan is translated as a camp, or a military camp and has parallels in the old written Mongolian language in the form of khogiua(n) ~ xoruya(n). Thus, "kurykan", perhaps, in its essence, is not an ethnonym, but a common name in relation to the region and the territorial community that inhabits it, at least at an early stage. Therefore, a possible translation of the term "uch kurykan" is "three military camps".

Before their migration, Yakuts were subject to some Mongolic admixture in the 7th century. The Yakuts originally lived around Olkhon and the region of Lake Baikal. Beginning in the 13th century they migrated to the basins of the Middle Lena, the Aldan and Vilyuy rivers under the pressure of the rising Mongols. The northern Yakuts were largely hunters, fishermen and reindeer herders, while the southern Yakuts raised cattle and horses.

See also 
Kurumchi culture

Citations

References 
 

Indigenous peoples of North Asia
Turkic peoples of Asia
History of Siberia